Heavy Machinery is a collaborative studio album by guitarist Allan Holdsworth, keyboardist Jens Johansson and drummer Anders Johansson, released in 1996 through Heptagon Records (Sweden), and on 12 August 1997 through Shrapnel Records (United States) and Pony Canyon (Japan).

Confusingly, on the album's European/US release, "Macrowaves" is made up of complete silence after 2:51, with an additional improvised "filler" keyboard and drum solo by the Johanssons at 23:46. On the Japanese release, "Macrowaves" only comprises the first part as normal without any silence; the silence has instead been moved to the bonus track, "The Moose Are Marching", where it fills the space from 7:59 to 20:45, after which the latter keyboard solo from "Macrowaves" ends the album.

Critical reception

John W. Patterson at AllMusic awarded Heavy Machinery three stars out of five, describing the album as "unforgettable fireworks of furious fusion" and "great jazz-rock fusion". He praised all three musicians for their intense playing, in particular comparing Holdsworth and Jens Johansson's jamming to the duo of guitarist Jeff Beck and keyboardist Jan Hammer, but remarked that the album is "just more intriguing than those Hammer/Beck excursions."

Track listing

Personnel
Allan Holdsworth – guitar, SynthAxe
Jens Johansson – keyboard, bass synthesizer, engineering, mixing, production
Anders Johansson – drums, production

Technical
Nolan Moffitte – engineering
Yoram Vazan – engineering
Krister Olsson – mastering

References

External links
Johansson/Holdsworth "Heavy Machinery" at Guitar Nine

Allan Holdsworth albums
Jens Johansson albums
1996 albums
Shrapnel Records albums
Collaborative albums
Pony Canyon albums